Dryburgh Suspension Bridge is a suspension bridge erected near Dryburgh Abbey, Scottish Borders.

History
The footbridge across the River Tweed was erected in 1872 with a gift intended to allow the Dryburgh villagers to worship at the churches in St. Boswells  (part of a ribbon of settlements including Newtown St. Boswells). An earlier bridge nearby, the Dryburgh Abbey Bridge, collapsed in 1818.

Design
It is a relatively simple design with only one suspended span.

References

External links

 

 

Bridges across the River Tweed
Bridges in the Scottish Borders
Bridges completed in 1872
Suspension bridges in the United Kingdom
1872 establishments in Scotland